Nolhivaranfaru (Dhivehi: ނޮޅިވަރަންފަރު) is one of the inhabited islands of Haa Dhaalu Atoll administrative division and geographically part of Thiladhummathi Atoll in the north of the Maldives.

History
Following the 1752 capture of Male' by the Ali Raja of Cannanore and his Malabari navy, Sultan Muhammad Imaduddin III of the Maldives was held captive on Kavaratti island in the Laccadives. Hussein Gadhahamaadhi Manikfan of Nolhivaramfaru is said to have aided Muleegey Dom Hassan Maniku in the fight against the invaders. They succeeded on 7 April 1753 and reclaimed the monarchy back to Maldivian rule.

Geography

It is located in between the island of Nolhivaram and Hanimaadhoo on the eastern fringes of the atoll. It is small predominantly agricultural community. Until taken over by Kulhudhuffushi, Nolhivaranfaru used to be the capital of the Haa Dhaalu division.

Demography

References

Populated places in the Maldives
Islands of the Maldives

he:נולהיואראנפארו